Patish (lit. Hammer) is a moshav in southern Israel. Located in the north-western Negev near Ofakim, it falls under the jurisdiction of Merhavim Regional Council.

History
The village was established on 3 March 1950, and was named after the nearby Horvat Patish (Patish Ruins). To begin with, immigrants from Egypt were brought to settle the site. However, they refused to leave the truck which brought them to the site. After several trials, a group of Kurdish Jews settled in the moshav in May that year.

In March 1955 armed Palestinian fedayeen from the Gaza Strip attacked a wedding at the village with hand grenades; 24 guests were injured and one killed.

References

External links
Patish Negev Information Centre

Kurdish-Jewish culture in Israel
Moshavim
Populated places established in 1950
Populated places in Southern District (Israel)
1950 establishments in Israel
Egyptian-Jewish culture in Israel